Scotts Mill is an unincorporated community in Maury County, in the U.S. state of Tennessee.

History
Variant names were "Ettaton", "New York", and "Scott Mill". A post office called Ettaton was established in 1884, and remained in operation until 1901. The community's inland location away from railroads hindered its growth.

References

Unincorporated communities in Maury County, Tennessee
Unincorporated communities in Tennessee